Charles C. Branas is the chair of the department of epidemiology at Columbia University's Mailman School of Public Health, a position he assumed on January 1, 2017. Before joining the Mailman School, he taught and conducted extensive research at the University of Pennsylvania's Perelman School of Medicine.

Research
Branas is known for studying human geography, public health, emergency medical care, and multiple aspects of gun violence, which he first became interested when he saw its effects firsthand while working as a paramedic. A 2004 study of his showed that rural US residents were at greater risk of gun suicide than urban residents were of gun homicide, and was subsequently cited by the US Supreme Court.  In 2009, he published the first study to show that individuals in possession of firearms were more than four times as likely to be shot than those not in possession. Also that year, he published a study showing that heavy drinkers were 2.67 more likely to be shot during an assault than people who did not drink at all. The study found that this association was largely because the drinkers spent so much time near liquor stores that sold alcohol to-go. In 2018, he led the first series of citywide randomized controlled trials (RCTs) showing that greening vacant lots, as well as requiring homeowners to put glass in their windows, resulted in significantly fewer gun assaults, shootings, and self-reported fear and depression among residents.  His work has shown that approximately 15% of the spaces in US cities is vacant or abandoned, a total area about the size of Switzerland, making low-cost citywide interventions like these of high value to urban planners and policymakers.

References

Living people
American epidemiologists
Gun violence researchers
Columbia University Mailman School of Public Health faculty
Johns Hopkins Bloomberg School of Public Health alumni
Perelman School of Medicine at the University of Pennsylvania faculty
Year of birth missing (living people)
Members of the National Academy of Medicine